The Santa Lucía River (Spanish, Río Santa Lucía) is a river in Corrientes Province, Argentina. It is a tributary of the Paraná River.

The Santa Lucía arises in the Iberá Wetlands and flows southwest past the towns of San Roque and Santa Lucía, then on to Goya, where it joins the Paraná.

See also
List of rivers of Argentina

References

 Rand McNally, The New International Atlas, 1993.

Rivers of Argentina
Tributaries of the Paraná River
Rivers of Corrientes Province